The Men's 10 metre air pistol event took place at 7 October 2010 at the CRPF Campus. There was a qualification held to determine the final participants.

Results

External links
Report

Shooting at the 2010 Commonwealth Games